Nizhny (masculine), Nizhnyaya (feminine), or Nizhneye (neuter), literally meaning "lower", is the name of several Russian localities. It may refer to:
 Nizhny Novgorod, a Russian city colloquially referred to as "Nizhny"
 Nizhny, Republic of Bashkortostan, a khutor in Chishminsky District of the Republic of Bashkortostan
 Nizhny, Samara Oblast, a settlement in Isaklinsky District of Samara Oblast
 Nizhnyaya, Kirov Oblast, a village in Pizhansky District of Kirov Oblast
 Nizhnyaya, Leningrad Oblast, a village in Gatchinsky District of Leningrad Oblast
 Nizhnyaya, Perm Krai, a village in Alexandrovsky District of Perm Krai
 Nizhneye, Bryansk Oblast, a selo in Starodubsky District of Bryansk Oblast
 Nizhneye, Kaluga Oblast, a selo in Zhukovsky District of Kaluga Oblast